Kar-go, is an autonomous delivery vehicle, designed and built by British company, Academy of Robotics Ltd, a UK company, registered in Wales. The vehicle uses self-drive / driverless car technology to drive itself to locations where it delivers packages autonomously.

History 

The parent company, Academy of Robotics, was founded in 2017 by entrepreneur  William Sachiti at Aberystwyth University. With a £10,000 grant from the university as part of its InvEnterPrize scheme, Academy of Robotics began developing the technology and the first prototype for Kar-go was unveiled in 2017. In late 2016, the company partnered with Pilgrim Motorsports, a specialist UK car manufacturer to build the Kar-go Delivery Bot vehicles. In early 2017, the parent company Academy of Robotics was announced to be part of NVIDIA's accelerator to further develop Kar-go. Shortly after the company's first crowdfunding raise in 2018, Academy of Robotics unveiled its autonomous data-gathering vehicles. These vehicles were used to develop Kar-go's driverless vehicle technology. Data such as imagery for object recognition and geometry to measure distance were collected, to be processed for use in their autonomous vehicles. Having developed basic prototypes to test the vision system, Academy of Robotics went on to develop custom-built vehicle hardware. The resulting Kar-go delivery bot vehicle  was unveiled at the Goodwood Festival of Speed in 2019.

As a new vehicle type, the Kar-go Delivery Bot underwent an assessment from the UK's DVSA (Driver and Vehicle Standards Agency), who verified that the core vehicle was roadworthy. Following minor modifications to install the autonomous technology, the vehicle was ready for road trials.

Having satisfied the core UK government requirements (being a roadworthy vehicle, having appropriate insurance in place and a driver or operator, in or out of the vehicle, who is ready, able, and willing to resume control of the vehicle),

These initial deliveries were part of a trial supported by funding for no-human-contact deliveries from UK Research and Innovation  as part of the Government's modern industrial strategy. Academy of Robotics chose to begin these first deliveries with the delivery of medical supplies from pharmacies to care  homes in the London Borough of Hounslow.

As part of these trials, the company developed a system for a remote command centre for a fleet of self-driving vehicles.

In February 2021, the company announced that it would be expanding its autonomous delivery trials to Surrey and other parts of the UK. The Surrey trials saw the company deliver goods for local Banstead (Surrey) store, Something Special.

In September 2021, the Royal Air Force (RAF) and Academy of Robotics announced that the RAF had been trialling the use of Kar-go autonomous delivery vehicles at the UK's largest airbase, RAF Brize Norton. The trials were jointly funded by the Academy of Robotics and the RAF's Astra innovation programme to understand and investigate the potential to use autonomous delivery vehicles to support the work of RAF personnel.

To comply with security regulations on the base by minimising data capture during the trials, the company developed a proprietary system to minimise data capture and enable the vehicle to navigate safely without the normal levels of scanning and training.

The Surrey trials and the RAF trials were featured on BBC Click in late September 2021 showcasing the company's latest innovation, the Mobile Command Hub which enables the company to monitor and remotely take-over control from the Kar-go vehicles if necessary. This remote take-over functionality enables the company to operate without having a safety driver in the vehicle in full compliance with UK guidelines for trials of autonomous vehicles on the roads.

The technology developed to operate the Kar-go vehicles has since been applied to "Helper Bots" developed by Academy of Robotics in close collaboration with staff at Milton Keynes University Hospital NHS Foundation Trust. In December 2022 Academy of Robotics unveiled its "Milton" Helper Bot, which the company had developed to support staff  by automating the delivery of medicines in hospitals. The company began trials of their Helper Bot technology at Milton Keynes University  Hospital at the end of 2022.

Technology 

Kar-go operates with the principle of 'terrain-training' wherein specialised logical rulesets and artificial intelligence modules are created for designated routes such as to ensure round-the-clock robust operation. Localisation on the route is achieved by fusing data from Visual SLAM (Simultaneous localisation and mapping), GPS feeds and pre-existing off-line map features. Real-time perception is implemented via a novel modular hierarchical architecture consisting of multiple function specific neural networks and computer vision algorithms that have been fine-tuned for the particular route.

The control software is completely autonomous once delivery timings and locations are determined. This is done autonomous using the Academy of Robotics’ proprietary vision system.  It makes high-level navigation turns such as intersection turns, lane changes etc. based on the vehicle's presence in a ‘global map space’ which is updated continuously based on factors such as delivery locations, traffic, routes of other delivery vehicles etc.

The company's research focuses on applying bio-inspired algorithms  to solve challenging vision-based problems. Rather than using technology like LiDAR, Kar-go uses camera vision.

The sensor suite focuses on vision with 6-8 cameras fitted on the vehicle depending on the particular operational configuration. The vehicle has GPS, IMU and a ring of sonar/distance sensors around it for a perception redundancy.

Production 

Kar-go was built in the UK in West Sussex. The vehicle was built in collaboration between the team at Academy of Robotics, the engineering team at Pilgrim Motorsports and Muscle Car UK's factory where it was being built from scratch. Some of the Kar-go scientists and engineers are also based at Pilgrim Motorsports.  In March 2018, the company announced that it had hired multi-award-winning vehicle design expert Paul Burgess from McLaren who led the engineering team.

Parent Company 
The parent company was founded in 2017 by entrepreneur  William Sachiti at Aberystwyth University. The company was seeded with a £10 000 grant from the university as part of its InvEnterPrize scheme. In late 2016, the company partnered with Pilgrim Motorsports, a specialist UK car manufacturer. In early 2017, Academy of Robotics was announced to be part of NVIDIA's accelerator to further develop Kar-go. In mid-2017, the company sought funding via Crowdfunding on the UK Financial Services Authority regulated platform Crowdcube and raised £320K at a £2 million post money valuation for its Kar-go project. In August 2018, the company raised additional funding from private investors. An offer was made for more cash which the company turned down in a move the CEO William Sachiti stated that he did not want to dilute the value for existing shareholders.

In November 2019, the company announced a partnership with Eurovia UK, part of the Vinci group, Eurovia announced its plans to test the Kar-go technology to automate the delivery of small plant equipment, tools, materials and other components to and from a highway work site as well as the potential use of data collected by Kar-go as it travels, to determine the condition of roads.The technology Academy of Robotics has developed is able to detect not only the potential hazards in the path such as the edge of a road in snowy conditions, but also the likely causes of deterioration on road surfaces.

In 2020 the company became the first UK company to have a vehicle designed for autonomous delivery licensed to drive on the roads in the UK.

Academy of Robotics was estimated to be valued between $50 million and a $250 million in early 2021.

In April 2021 the company received a £1 million match-funding investment through the UK government's Future Fund scheme and went on to open up opportunities for the public to invest in the company directly with the launch of a second crowdfunding raise on the Crowdcube platform. Commenting on the announcement, UK Minister for Investment Lord Grimstone said: "The UK is a world leader in the development of automated vehicles and we are working closely with industry to ensure we remain one of the best locations in the world for automotive innovation, providing jobs across the country. Today's announcement demonstrates our commitment to encouraging the growth of high potential British technology companies, and I look forward to seeing Academy of Robotics go from strength to strength as we build back better." The company raised half a million GBP on the Crowdcube platform from over 300 investors.

In early 2022 William Sachiti acquired the 26 acre former RAF base, remote radar head, RAF Neatishead and began renovating the site with the intention to lease parts of the site to his company, Academy of Robotics. The RAF Neatishead site offers a network of private test tracks and around 20 buildings including 2 hangars and an approximately 4 acre underground Cold War era nuclear bunker as well as a heritage listed Type 84 radar.

The company’s services now include: self-driving delivery and road defect detection and analysis technology and hospital Helper Bots.

See also 
 Starship Technologies
 Drive PX-series
 Otto (company)
 Waymo
 Tesla, Inc.

References

External links 
 

Car manufacturers of the United Kingdom
British companies established in 2016
Experimental self-driving cars
Aberystwyth University